The Embassy of the People's Republic of China in Tanzania is the diplomatic mission of China to Tanzania.

See also 
Embassy of Tanzania, Beijing

References 

China–Tanzania relations
Tanzania
China